is the former mayor of Chiba, Chiba in Japan, serving from his election in 2001 until his arrest and subsequent retirement in 2009 for corruption-related charges. He was an independent who had previously served in the Home Affairs Ministry. He is a graduate of the University of Tokyo.

References 

 Corresponding Japanese Wikipedia article. Retrieved on December 10, 2007.

1940 births
Living people
People from Chiba (city)
University of Tokyo alumni
Mayors of places in Japan